Adomian is a surname. Notable people with the surname include:

 George Adomian (1922–1996), American mathematician
Adomian decomposition method for solving differential equations
 James Adomian (born 1980), American actor and comedian